For the Girls is the seventh album and sixth studio album of actress and singer Kristin Chenoweth.

Overview
On August 13, 2019, Chenoweth announced via her social media that she would release her next studio album in the fall of 2019. The album itself would be her most personal cover album yet, paying tribute to many of strong female artists who inspired her as an entertainer including Dolly Parton, Barbra Streisand, Doris Day, Judy Garland, Carole King, and others. She also revealed that the album would include duets with artists such as Parton and Reba McEntire, along with her former Hairspray Live co-stars Ariana Grande and Jennifer Hudson.

The lyric video for "You Don't Own Me", a duet with Ariana Grande, was released the same day as the album on September 27, 2019.

In support of the album, Chenoweth announced she would return to Broadway with her second Broadway concert residency of the same name, consisting of eight performances at Broadway's Nederlander Theatre

Track listing

Charts

References

2019 albums
Concord Records albums
Kristin Chenoweth albums